Les Moneghetti is the northcentral Ward in the Principality of Monaco. Moneghetti was incorporated in La Condamine.

Overview
Situated in an area where the Alps drop into the Mediterranean Sea; Les Moneghetti has steep inclines. Its parish church, Sacred Heart, contains the headquarters of the Association des Guides et Scouts de Monaco. Monaco's only railway station, Gare de Monaco-Monte-Carlo, is located in Les Moneghetti. The Compagnie des Carabiniers du Prince is barracked in Les Moneghetti.

Transport 
The district is crossed by the Boulevard de Rainier III and the Boulevard du Jardin Exotique, as well as the Boulevard Belgique (Belgium). Other streets include Rue Bosio, Rue Louis Aureglia, Rue Augustin vento and Rue Malbousquet.

See also 
 Municipality of Monaco

References

External links 

Quarters of Monaco
France–Monaco border crossings